Giedrė Žickytė (born June 30, 1980) is a Lithuanian film director, producer, documentary film maker.

In 2022 she was awarded the Lithuanian National Prize for Culture and Arts "for a vigorous and impressive creative leap".

She is married to a Lithuanian diplomat  (since 2016).

Notable filmography
2009: ; documentary about the avant-garde Lithuanian actor and filmmaker Artūras Barysas "Baras". The film won the 2009 "Silver Crane" award for the best TV film
2011: ; documentary about music of the "Singing Revolution" in Lithuania and the impact on it by the band Antis, started as a joke parodying the Soviet life. Nominated at the 2012  "Silver Crane" awards in the category of the best documentary film
2014: ; documentary about the Lithuanian photographer . The film won 4 nominations at the 2015 Silver Crane awards: the best documentary film of the year, the best work of the director of the year, the best work of cinematography, the best work of the director of editing
2016: Yo no soy de aquí (I'm Not from Here), co-directed with Maite Alberdi; documentary about a woman in a nursing home who thinks she had just arrived from the Basque Country, Best Documentary Short Film, 11th Pedro Sienna Awards; nominated for the Best Documentary at the 29th European Film Awards
2020: The Jump, documentary about the Soviet Lithuanian defector Simas Kudirka; Best Documentary Feature Award at the 36th Warsaw International Film Festival
2020: (co-producer) The Earth Is Blue as an Orange, documentary film, directed and written by Iryna Tsilyk; Directing Award in the "World Cinema Documentary” category for the film at the 2020 Sundance Film Festival.

References

External links

1980 births
Living people
Lithuanian film directors
Recipients of the Lithuanian National Prize